Evin Crowley is a Northern Irish actress born 1945, Bangor. Evin started as a Lyric Player at the home of Mary O'Malley and her husband (later to become the Lyric Theatre, Belfast).

Career
Evin first appeared on stage from the mid-to-late 1960s.

In 1970, she made her television debut in The Sinners, playing the part of Sister Magdalene. In the same year, she played Moureen in David Lean's Ryan's Daughter. Her role was memorable as a mischief-making hussy. In the following year, Evin was Nominated for a BAFTA Film Award (Best Supporting Actress) for her role in Ryan's Daughter.

Notable television roles also include that of scullery maid Emily in Upstairs, Downstairs, where Evin was critically praised for her performance in the episode I Dies from Love, wherein; Emily falls for a footman from another home, and is rejected.

Evin also played Biddy Hall in the ABC historical drama Ban Hall (1975).

Filmography

References

External links

1945 births
Living people
Television actresses from Northern Ireland
People from Bangor, County Down